WDU may refer to one of several things:

 WDU (software), a DOS mainframe disc utility
 Wadjigu language has the ISO-639 code wdu
 Wellington Diamond United, a former New Zealand soccer club
 West Dulwich railway station, in England, has the railcode WDU
 West Dunbartonshire, Scotland, has the ISO code WDU
 Western Delta University in Nigeria
 Workers Defense Union (1918-1923), a radical legal defense organization in the United States
 Waste disposal unit, UK name for garbage disposal unit